The Premier League refers to the top football division in England. It may also refer to a number of other professional sport leagues:

Basketball
 Bahraini Premier League (basketball)
 Egyptian Basketball Premier League
 Israeli Basketball Premier League
 Jordanian Premier Basketball League
 Premier Basketball League
 Premier League (Australia)
 Premier League (Iceland)
 Saudi Premier League (basketball)

Cricket
 Bangladesh Premier League
 Caribbean Premier League
 English Premier League (cricket)
 Indian Premier League
 Lanka Premier League
 Sri Lanka Premier League

Association football
 Armenian Premier League
 Azerbaijan Premier League
 Bahraini Premier League
 Belarusian Premier League
 Premier League of Belize
 Bengal Premier League Soccer
 Premier League of Bosnia and Herzegovina
 Burundi Premier League
 Canadian Premier League
 Crimean Premier League
 Dhivehi Premier League
 Egyptian Premier League
 Ethiopian Premier League
 Faroe Islands Premier League
 Fiji Premier League
 Ghana Premier League
 Hong Kong Premier League
 Indonesian Premier League
 Liga Primer Indonesia
 League of Ireland Premier Division
 NIFL Premiership (Northern Ireland)
 Israeli Premier League
 Kyrgyz Premier League
 Kazakhstan Premier League
 Kenyan Premier League
 North Korea Premier League
 Kuwaiti Premier League
 Lebanese Premier League
 Malaysia Premier League
 Maltese Premier League
 Mongolian National Premier League
 National Premier League (Jamaica)
 National Premier Leagues (Australia)
 Nigeria Premier League
 Pakistan Premier League
 Primeira Liga (Portugal)
 Premier Soccer League (South Africa)
 Russian Premier League
 Saudi Premier League
 Singapore Premier League
 Scottish Football League Premier Division (1975–1998)
 Scottish Premier League (1998–2013)
 Scottish Premiership (2013–present)
 South Sudan Premier League
 Sri Lanka Football Premier League
 Sudan Premier League
 Syrian Premier League
 Taiwan Football Premier League
 Tanzanian Premier League
 Thai Premier League
 Ugandan Premier League
 Ukrainian Premier League
 Welsh Premier League

Field Hockey League
 Hockey India League
 Premier Hockey League (South Africa)

Ice Hockey League

Rugby league
 New South Wales Cup, formerly known as the NSWRL Premier League

Rugby union
 Premiership Rugby

Speedway
 Premier League (speedway)

Snooker
 Premier League Snooker

Darts
 Premier League Darts

See also
 1st Division (disambiguation)
 First League (disambiguation)
 Premiership (disambiguation)